Spirit of Seventy Sex is a 1976 pornographic film starring Annette Haven and John C. Holmes. Co-written, produced and directed by Stu Segall, it is a tongue-in-cheek look at the sex lives of the Founding Fathers, including George Washington (and his wife Martha, who is played by Haven), Benjamin Franklin and Captain John Smith (Holmes). The film was released the year United States celebrated its Bicentennial.

Cast
 Annette Haven as Martha Washington
 John C. Holmes as Captain John Smith
 Tyler Reynolds as George
 John Seeman as Ben
 Jeff Lyle as Paul
 Ebenezer Bartholomu as himself

Reception
Christos Mouroukis from Cinema Head Cheese found the film boring and with nothing else to offer then "standard sex scenes". "This is a boring collage of standard sex scenes starring known porn faces [such as Annette Haven] while dressed in period costumes and talking about historical nonsense. Certainly not the kind of information one would like to receive from his porn."

See also
 Golden Age of Porn

References

External links
 

1976 films
1970s pornographic films
American pornographic films
1970s English-language films
Films set in the United States
1970s American films